Thomas Ebner (born 22 February 1992) is an Austrian professional footballer who plays as a midfielder for Admira Wacker.

Club career
On 1 September 2021, he returned to Admira Wacker on a season-long deal.

Club statistics

Updated to games played as of 6 July 2016.

References

External links
 
 

1992 births
Living people
Sportspeople from Baden bei Wien
Footballers from Lower Austria
Austrian footballers
Association football midfielders
FC Admira Wacker Mödling players
FK Austria Wien players
Austrian Football Bundesliga players